Coleophora vanderwolfi is a moth of the family Coleophoridae. It is found on the Iberian Peninsula.

The larvae feed on Carex cespitosa.

References

vanderwolfi
Moths of Europe
Moths described in 1985